It is a national flower festival held annually in Masanhappo-gu, Changwon, South Gyeongsang Province.

The Masan Gagopa Chrysanthemum Festival(hangul : 마산가고파 국화축제) celebrates the excellence of the chrysanthemum and has been held since 2000 to promote the consumption of chrysanthemum.

It started with the first 'Masan Chrysanthemum Festival' in 2000 and changed its name to the 'Masan Chrysanthemum Exhibition' in 2002.
In 2005, the festival changed its name to the 'Masan Gagopa Chrysanthemum Festival'. The festival features a song contest, an essay contest, and a Si-nangsong(poetry recitation) contest. About 1.5 million tourists visit during the festival.

Masan is a place where the history of chrysanthemum cultivation is enshrined. 
In 1961, six farms in Hoewon-dong started the first chrysanthemum commercial in the nation.
It has grown since then and was exported to Japan for the first time in 1972. It currently accounts for 13 percent of the nation's growing farmland.

References

External links

Annual events in South Korea
Flower festivals in South Korea
Culture of Changwon
Autumn events in South Korea